Suresh Pasi is an Indian Politician and  current Member of Legislative Assembly. He represents Jagdishpur Vidhan Sabha constituency Amethi Uttar Pradesh and is a member of Bharatiya Janata Party. He came into limelight when He started fighting with one of his own party MLA from Tiloi constituency, Mayankeshwar Singh.

Early life and family background

Political career

References

Yogi ministry
People from Amethi district
Bharatiya Janata Party politicians from Uttar Pradesh
Living people
Uttar Pradesh MLAs 2017–2022
Bahujan Samaj Party politicians from Uttar Pradesh
Samajwadi Party politicians
India MPs 1999–2004
Lok Sabha members from Uttar Pradesh
People from Kaushambi district
1981 births
Uttar Pradesh MLAs 2022–2027